San Roque Department is a  department of Corrientes Province in Argentina.

Settlements 
 Nueve de Julio
 Chavarría
 Pedro R. Fernández
 San Roque

Departments of Corrientes Province